Avanak may refer to:

Avanak, Voice broadcasting operator
Avanak, Alborz
Avanak, Qazvin